CW11 may refer to:

CW11, a postcode district in the CW postcode area

The CW Television Network affiliates:

 KPLR-TV St. Louis, Missouri (O&O)
 KSTW Seattle/Tacoma, Washington
 WPIX New York City (O&O), now known on air as "PIX 11"
 WBXI (The CW Plus) Binghamton, New York